Journey into Life: The World of the Unborn is a 1990 American short documentary film directed by Derek Bromhall. It was nominated for an Academy Award for Best Documentary Short.

References

External links

1990 films
1990 short films
1990 documentary films
American short documentary films
1990s short documentary films
American independent films
1990 independent films
1990s English-language films
1990s American films